Itabirinha (formerly Itabirinha de Mantena) is a municipality in eastern Minas Gerais in Brazil, in the region of Rio Doce. In 2020, the population of the city was 11,576.

See also 

 1985 hailstorm in eastern Minas Gerais

References

Municipalities in Minas Gerais